Dipak Nanalal Chudasama (born 20 May 1963) is a former Kenyan cricketer of Indian Gujarati origin. He was a right-handed batsman. Known as "The Doc", Chudasama was, as well as being a cricketer, a fully qualified orthodontist. He is the first Kenyan player to score an international century.

International career
Having made his debut as early on as 1980, Chudasama represented Kenya at the 1996 World Cup, and the 1990, 1994 and 1997 ICC Trophies. In all, he played in 20 One-Day International matches.

His top innings score was a stylish 122 against Bangladesh in Nairobi, a then-record opening partnership for the nation of Kenya. Chudasama has toured several countries in Asia and Africa, as well as Holland.

Beyond cricket
Outside of playing cricket, Chudasama also represented Kenya at the 1982 Commonwealth Table Tennis Championships in Bombay, India.

Following his professional career, Chudasama went on to become a well known orthodontist based in Coppell, Texas. He also taught Orthodontics at Jacksonville University for several years prior to opening his practice.

References

External links
 

1963 births
Living people
Kenyan Hindus
Kenyan people of Indian descent
Kenyan cricketers
Sportspeople from Mombasa
Kenya One Day International cricketers
Kenyan table tennis players
Kenyan people of Gujarati descent